MCAT is the Medical College Admission Test.

MCAT, MCat or M-Cat may also refer to:

 MCAT Pakistan, now known as NMDCAT (National Medical and Dental College Admission Test)

Science 

Storage Resource Broker, Metadata Catalog
Mephedrone, a stimulant
Methcathinone, a stimulant
(acyl-carrier-protein) S-malonyltransferase, an enzyme
MCAT (gene), a gene that in humans encodes the enzyme malonyl CoA-acyl carrier protein transacylase, mitochondrial
Moraxella catarrhalis, a Gram-negative bacteria

Entertainment 

m.c.A.T (born 1961), Japanese musician and producer born Aquio Togashi
Monstercat, a Canadian electronic dance music record label

Transportation 

Middlesex County Area Transit, a bus network in Middlesex County, New Jersey
Manatee County Area Transit